Vlahovići is a village in the municipality of Ljubinje, Republika Srpska, Bosnia and Herzegovina.

References

Populated places in Ljubinje
Villages in Republika Srpska